Loyd is an unincorporated community in Moffat County, Colorado, United States.

Notes

Unincorporated communities in Moffat County, Colorado
Unincorporated communities in Colorado